Star Wars: The Force Awakens is the seventh film in the Star Wars franchise, released ten years after the previous entry. Co-written and directed by J. J. Abrams, the film stars Adam Driver, Daisy Ridley, John Boyega and Oscar Isaac in new roles, with Harrison Ford, Mark Hamill, and Carrie Fisher reprising their roles from the original trilogy which concluded in 1983. Prior to its release, the film was predicted by box office analysts to break records, citing the relative lack of competition owing to its date of release, being released in large formats such as IMAX in a high number of venues, and multi-generational appeal to both fans of the previous movies and children as success factors.

The Force Awakens was released in December 2015 and went on to break multiple box office records in various markets. The film set the worldwide records for the highest-grossing opening weekend and the fastest to gross $1 billion. In its domestic market of the United States and Canada, it set the records for the highest-grossing film, opening day, first through third weekends, and single calendar month, as well as the fastest cumulative grosses through $900 million. In other markets, it became the highest-grossing film in the United Kingdom and set opening weekend records in several countries including the UK, Germany, Australia, and Russia.

A large proportion of the records were set in the domestic market of the United States and Canada. A comparative lack of Star Wars nostalgia and unfavourable currency exchange rates were identified as factors limiting the film's box office performance in other markets, while repeat viewings during the December holiday season boosted sales in the domestic market. A compounding factor is that whereas the US and Canada box office is closely tracked by sites such as Box Office Mojo and The Numbers, the same is not true for other box office territories. Many of the records set by the film are listed below. Data on the previous record and records that have since been surpassed are presented where available and applicable. All grosses are given in unadjusted US dollars, except where noted otherwise.

Worldwide
Worldwide, the film set records for the highest-grossing opening weekend and the fastest to gross $1 billion, as well as several IMAX records.

United States and Canada 

In the domestic market, the film grossed more money faster than any previous film. It set several records for specific time frames and days of the week, including ones that were still records when adjusting for inflation. Many of the records it broke were set by Jurassic World, which was released six months prior in June 2015.

Other territories 
Outside of the United States and Canada market, the film set opening records in one form or another in 30 different markets. The United Kingdom and Ireland market saw several records surpassed, including the record for the highest-grossing film of all time. Data on precise figures, previous record holders, and surpassed records is limited due to the absence of box office record trackers for these markets.

References 

Box office records set by Star Wars: The Force Awakens
Star Wars: The Force Awakens
Box office records set by Star Wars: The Force Awakens
Box office records